The 2015–16 season was FK Vardar's 24th consecutive season in the First League. This article shows player statistics and all official matches that the club will play during the 2015–16 season.

Squad
As of 20 February 2016

Left club during season

Competitions

Supercup

First League

League table

First phase

Second phase

Results summary

Results by round

Matches

First phase

Macedonian Cup

First round

Second round

Quarter-finals

UEFA Champions League

Second qualifying round

Statistics

Top scorers

 Players whose names are written with Italic letters played only in the first half of the season.

References

FK Vardar seasons
Vardar
Vardar